The Battle of Gorjani or Battle of Đakovo was a battle fought on 9 October 1537 at Gorjani, a place in present-day Slavonia (today in eastern Croatia), between the towns of Đakovo and Valpovo, as part of the Little War in Hungary as well as the Hundred Years' Croatian–Ottoman War.

Background
After seven years of war and the failed Siege of Vienna in 1529, the Treaty of Konstantiniyye was signed, in which John Zápolya was recognized by the Austrians as King of Hungary as an Ottoman vassal, and the Ottomans recognized Habsburg rule over Royal Hungary.

This treaty satisfied neither John Zápolya nor Austrian Archduke Ferdinand, whose armies began to skirmish along the borders. Ferdinand decided to strike a decisive blow in 1537 at John, thereby violating the treaty.

Battle
Ferdinand sent an army of 24,000 men (from Austria, Hungary, Holy Roman Empire, Bohemia, Tyrol, and Croatia) under the command of the Carniolan nobleman Johann Katzianer to take Osijek.

The siege came to nothing and because of the appearance of the Ottoman cavalry sent by the governor of Belgrade, the army had to withdraw. The Ottoman army reached the Austrians near the swamps of Gorjani, near Đakovo and Valpovo on the Drava river. Katzianer noticed that the Ottoman army was smaller than he had expected, and ordered his fastest units to attack the Ottoman cavalry. The Ottoman cavalry fell back, but only to lure the Austrian cavalry into a trap. The Osijek garrison, as well as the Ottoman cavalry promptly attacked from both sides and the front, killing much of the Austrian cavalry. The Ottomans then launched a counterattack against Katzianer’s now defenseless infantry. The Austrians were severely defeated and Katzianer fled with the remaining cavalry and abandoned his army. The entire force was annihilated.

A reported 20,000 men were killed, including generals Ludwig Lodron and Pavle Bakić. Bakić's severed head was taken to Constantinople.

Aftermath

This campaign was a disaster of similar magnitude to that of Mohács and therefore nicknamed the Austrian Mohacs. The news of the defeat came as a shock in Vienna and a new Treaty of Nagyvárad was signed in 1538.

Katzianer was arrested, and Nikola Jurišić took his place as the commander of Croatian defence. Some time later, Katzianer escaped the Vienna prison and hid at the Zrinski estates, until he lost Zrinski's favor, and was thus executed.

References

Sources
 
 
 
 

1537 in Europe
Conflicts in 1537
Battles involving Habsburg Croatia
Battles involving Hungary
Battles involving the Holy Roman Empire
Battles involving Austria
Battles involving the Ottoman Empire
1537 in the Ottoman Empire
16th century military history of Croatia
Gorjani